Tyrees Allen (born July 31, 1954) is an American actor on stage, television, and film.

Early life
Allen was born in Salina, Kansas.  In 1972, he graduated from Salina Central High School.  He later attended Marymount College in Salina, where he graduated with a degree in Theater Arts.

Career
Allen's fifty-five television credits include these: series regular roles on Women's Murder Club and Dark Blue; recurring and guest roles on The Practice, Alias, Cold Case, Without A Trace, Castle, Scandal,  CSI:Miami, and Brothers & Sisters.

Allen appeared in New York in the 2000 Broadway production of Aida and the 2003 Broadway revival of William Shakespeare's Henry IV.

In May 2013, Allen played the role of "Troy Maxson" in the August Wilson play Fences at the African-American Repertory Theater in DeSoto, Texas.

In 2018, Allen starred in the SpeakEasy Stage Company's production of Between Riverside and Crazy as Walter "Pops" Washington, a role for which he won both the Elliot Norton Award for Outstanding Actor and IRNE Award for Best Actor. He returned to SpeakEasy the following season to play Robin in The Children.

Filmography

Film

Television

References

External links
 
 

1954 births
American male television actors
American male film actors
Living people
Male actors from Kansas
People from Salina, Kansas